This article is a list of the butterworts, the species of the genus Pinguicula.  For general information on butterworts, please see the main article on Pinguicula.

The genus Pinguicula contains the 83 species of butterworts, belonging to the bladderwort family (Lentibulariaceae).  It has a natural distribution across most of the Northern Hemisphere, though over half of the species are concentrated in Mexico and Central America. Siegfried Jost Casper systematically divided them into three subgenera with 15 sections. Subsequent phylogenetic research showed that many of these groupings are polyphyletic, but they are used below.

Subgenus Isoloba

Section Agnata 

Pinguicula agnata
Pinguicula albida
Pinguicula benedicta
Pinguicula cubensis
Pinguicula filifolia
Pinguicula gigantea
Pinguicula infundibuliformis
Pinguicula lithophytica
Pinguicula pilosa

Section Cardiophyllum 

Pinguicula crystallina
Pinguicula crystallina subsp. hirtiflora
Pinguicula habilii

Section Discoradix 

Pinguicula casabitoana
Pinguicula lignicola

Section Heterophyllum 

Pinguicula acuminata
Pinguicula conzattii
Pinguicula heterophylla
Pinguicula imitatrix
Pinguicula kondoi
Pinguicula mirandae
Pinguicula parvifolia
Pinguicula rotundiflora

Section Isoloba 

Pinguicula caerulea – blue-flower butterwort
Pinguicula ionantha – Godfrey's butterwort, violet butterwort
Pinguicula lilacina
Pinguicula lusitanica – pale butterwort
Pinguicula lutea – yellow butterwort
Pinguicula planifolia – Chapman's butterwort
Pinguicula primuliflora – southern butterwort
Pinguicula pumila – small butterwort
Pinguicula sharpii
Pinguicula takakii

Subgenus Pinguicula

Section Crassifolia 

Pinguicula ehlersiae
Pinguicula esseriana
Pinguicula debbertiana
Pinguicula jaumavensis

Section Homophyllum 

Pinguicula greenwoodii
Pinguicula jackii
Pinguicula lippoldii
Pinguicula toldensis

Section Longitubus 

Pinguicula calderoniae
Pinguicula crassifolia
Pinguicula hemiepiphytica
Pinguicula laueana
Pinguicula utricularioides

Section Nana 

Pinguicula villosa – hairy butterwort

Section Orcheosanthus 

Pinguicula colimensis
Pinguicula cyclosecta
Pinguicula elizabethiae
Pinguicula gypsicola
Pinguicula macrophylla
Pinguicula mesophytica
Pinguicula moctezumae
Pinguicula moranensis
Pinguicula oblongiloba
Pinguicula orchidioides (synonym P. stolonifera)
Pinguicula zecheri

Section Orchidioides 

Pinguicula laxifolia

Section Pinguicula 
Pinguicula balcanica –  Balkanian butterwort
Pinguicula balcanica var. tenuilaciniata
Pinguicula corsica
Pinguicula grandiflora – large-flowered butterwort
Pinguicula grandiflora subsp. rosea
Pinguicula leptoceras
Pinguicula longifolia – long-leaved butterwort
Pinguicula longifolia causensis
Pinguicula longifolia dertosensis
Pinguicula longifolia reichenbachiana
Pinguicula macroceras – California butterwort
Pinguicula macroceras var. macroceras
Pinguicula macroceras nortensis
Pinguicula mundi
Pinguicula nevadensis
Pinguicula poldinii
Pinguicula vallisneriifolia
Pinguicula vulgaris – common butterwort

Subgenus Temnoceras

Section Ampullipalatum 

Pinguicula antarctica
Pinguicula calyptrata
Pinguicula chilensis
Pinguicula involuta
Pinguicula elongata

Section Micranthus 

Pinguicula algida
Pinguicula alpina – Alpine butterwort 
Pinguicula ramosa
Pinguicula variegata

Section Temnoceras 

Pinguicula clivorum
Pinguicula crenatiloba
Pinguicula emarginata
Pinguicula gracilis
Pinguicula immaculata

Incertae sedis 
Pinguicula chuquisacensis

References, external links, and further reading 

 Casper, S. J.: Monographie der Gattung Pinguicula, (Bibliotheca Botanica, Heft 127/128), 1966, Stuttgart

 Schlauer, Jan: Carnivorous Plant Database, version Nov. 15, 16:25.

List
Pinguicula, List
Pinguicula

ca:Pinguicula
sv:Tätörter